Kari Heikkilä (born 10 January 1960) is a Finnish former ice hockey player and coach.

He played majority of his career in Ilves, but had also stints in Sweden (HC Vita Hästen and Luleå HF) and in Italy, where he ended his career in 1994.

After that he started coaching. In SM-liiga he has coached HPK in autumn 1997 before being sacked, as well as Kärpät in 2001-04 and Blues in 2005-07. He won the championship with Kärpät in 2004 and got silver medal the year before.

He has also coached Lokomotiv Yaroslavl in Russia, with major success. In 2005 he coached them to bronze, in 2008 and 2009 to silver. On August 16, 2010 Kari Heikkilä signed three-year contract with the Belarusian Ice Hockey Association.

References 

 

1960 births
Living people
Finnish ice hockey defencemen
Victoria Cougars (WHL) players
Calgary Wranglers (WHL) players
Ilves players
Luleå HF players
Finnish expatriate ice hockey players in Canada
Finnish expatriate ice hockey players in Italy
Finnish expatriate ice hockey players in Sweden
Finnish ice hockey coaches
Finnish expatriate ice hockey people in Belarus
Finnish expatriate ice hockey people in Kazakhstan
Finnish expatriate ice hockey people in Latvia
Finnish expatriate ice hockey people in Russia
Finnish expatriate ice hockey people in Sweden
SHC Fassa players
Finnish expatriate ice hockey coaches